Doublemoon Records, founded in 1998 as an offshoot of Pozitif Productions, is an independent pioneering record label based in Istanbul, Turkey, dedicated to spreading the city's music around the world. Doublemoon has concentrated on world fusion music, bringing together jazz and world, acoustic and electronic, and occidental and oriental music.

Doublemoon has received a number of accolades including being selected as one of the three most important independent record labels by the French publication, Vibrations; reaching number one on the European World Music Charts; and being listed among the top ten record labels in the world by WOMEX/World Music Charts Europe. Doublemoon's artists play the sound of Istanbul at some of the world's biggest festivals like Montreux Jazz, Montreal Jazz, Exi, and Roskilde. they have appeared on the covers of magazines like Global Rhythm and received nominations for the BBC Radio 3 world music awards.

Genres
World fusion, jazz and world, acoustic and electronic, Sufi-electronica, groove alla turca, gypsy funk, oriental hip hop and Anatolian blues.

Notable artists

 Baba Zula
 Mercan Dede
 Orientation
 Replikas
 Wax Poetic

Doublemoon compilations
 East 2 West Vol.1 Global Departures (2003, DM016)
 East 2 West Vol.2 Ethno Electronic Tales (2004, DM021)
 East 2 West Vol.3 İstanbul Strait Up (2005, DM025)
 East 2 West Vol.4 Crossing Continents (2006, DM037)
 Doublemoon Remixed (2007, DM039)
 Istanbul Twilight (2007, DM043)
 Doublemoon Kadınları (2008, DM044)
 Doublemoon Remixed 2 (2009, DM049)

Subsidiary labels
 Pozitif Records
 Voltaj
 Numoon

See also
 List of record labels
 List of world music record labels

References

External links
 Official site
 Official Myspace
 Youtube
 Facebook

Turkish independent record labels
World music record labels
Record labels established in 1998
Jazz record labels